In enzymology, an alpha,alpha-trehalose phosphorylase is an enzyme that catalyzes the chemical reaction

alpha,alpha-trehalose + phosphate  D-glucose + beta-D-glucose 1-phosphate

Thus, the two substrates of this enzyme are trehalose and phosphate, whereas its two products are D-glucose and beta-D-glucose 1-phosphate.

This enzyme belongs to the family of glycosyltransferases, specifically the hexosyltransferases.  The systematic name of this enzyme class is alpha,alpha-trehalose:phosphate beta-D-glucosyltransferase. This enzyme is also called trehalose phosphorylase.  This enzyme participates in starch and sucrose metabolism.

References

 

EC 2.4.1
Enzymes of unknown structure